Terry French , is a Canadian politician in Newfoundland and Labrador, Canada. French represented the district of Conception Bay South in the Newfoundland and Labrador House of Assembly from 2002 to 2014. He was acclaimed as mayor of Conception Bay South in the 2017 Newfoundland and Labrador municipal elections.

He was first elected to the provincial assembly in a 2002 by-election held following the death of his father Bob French, who had represented the riding since 1996.

He served in the cabinets of Danny Williams, Kathy Dunderdale and Tom Marshall. He has served as the Minister of Tourism, Culture and Recreation, Minister of Environment and Conservation and as the Minister of Justice. On September 19, 2014, French resigned his Conception Bay South seat.

In 2015, he was named president of the Construction Labour Relations Association of Newfoundland and Labrador.

Electoral record

|-

|-

|NDP
|Noah Davis-Power
|align="right"|1263
|align="right"|24.06%
|align="right"|
|-

|}

|-

|-

|-

|NDP
|Touria Tougui
|align="right"|259
|align="right"|4.4%
|align="right"|
|}

|-

|-

|-

|NDP
|Sheina Lerman
|align="right"|372
|align="right"|5.51%
|align="right"|
|}

}
|-

|-

|-

|NDP
|Ann Price
|align="right"|73
|align="right"|1.6%
|align="right"|
|}

References

Living people
People from Conception Bay South
Progressive Conservative Party of Newfoundland and Labrador MHAs
21st-century Canadian politicians
Mayors of places in Newfoundland and Labrador
Year of birth missing (living people)